Joe D'Alessandris (born April 29, 1954) is an American football coach who is the offensive line coach for the Baltimore Ravens of the National Football League (NFL). Prior to his time in Baltimore, he served as the offensive line coach for the San Diego Chargers and Buffalo Bills, and as an assistant offensive line coach for the Kansas City Chiefs.

Coaching career
D'Alessandris was hired by the Baltimore Ravens as their offensive line coach on January 19, 2017. 
D'Alessandris missed the Ravens' week 12 game in 2020 against the Pittsburgh Steelers due to an illness (COVID-19).

Personal life
D'Alessandris married Toni Mayfield shortly after college.  They have three daughters, Kelly, Emily and Anna; and four grandchildren.  Toni passed away on May 4, 2022.

References

1954 births
Living people
American football offensive guards
Western Carolina Catamounts football players
Western Carolina Catamounts football coaches
West Alabama Tigers football coaches
Memphis Tigers football coaches
Chattanooga Mocs football coaches
Ottawa Rough Riders coaches
Birmingham Fire coaches
Samford Bulldogs football coaches
Texas A&M Aggies football coaches
Pittsburgh Panthers football coaches
Duke Blue Devils football coaches
Georgia Tech Yellow Jackets football coaches
Kansas City Chiefs coaches
Buffalo Bills coaches
San Diego Chargers coaches
Baltimore Ravens coaches